Tierralta is a town and municipality located in the Córdoba Department, northern Colombia.

Corregimientos
Callejas
Crucito
Palmira
Santa Fé de Ralito
Caramelo
San Clemente
Las Claras
Saiza
Frasquillo
Volador
El Toro
San Felipe de Cadillo
Batata
Tucurá
Nueva Granada
Santa Marta
Villa Providencia
Carrizola
Urra Campo Bello
Nuevo Oriente

References

 Gobernacion de Cordoba - Tierralta
 Tierralta official website

Municipalities of Córdoba Department